Kavan Tissa, also known as Kavantissa, Kaha Wan Thissa,(that means who has the color of golden body) or Kaka Wanna Tissa,( that means who has black skin tone like a crow). was the king of the Kingdom of Ruhuna in the southern part of Sri Lanka. He ruled Ruhuna, in the same time as Kelani Tissa of Maya Rata and the usurping Tamil king of Anuradhapura, Ellalan of South India, who was projecting power from the Rajarata region across the island of Sri Lanka. Kavan Tissa was a great-grandson of King Devanampiyatissa's youngest brother Mahanaga, and also the father of the great Sinhalese King Dutugemunu.

In Wilhelm Geiger's rendering of the Mahavamsa Kavantissa is given as Kakavannatissa. Under that name the Mahavamsa mentions him twice.
In chapter 15 Kavantissa, or Kakavannatissa is the son of a king named Gothabhaya and father of king Abhaya better known as Dutthagamini, correctly spelled as Dutugemunu.
Chapter 15 of the Mahavamsa has been called, either by Geiger or by previous scribes, "The acceptance of the Mahavihara".
Chapter 22 of the Mahavamsa, "The birth of Prince Gamani" is mention of the city of Rohana where there are "still princes who have faith in the three gems" (Buddha, his Teaching, the Community of monastics). This chapter 22 describes the war against the Damila. This name of Damila occurs both in the Mahavamsa and in the Culavamsa (Small Cronicle).

As with his son Dutugemunu, Kavan Tissa's figure is mostly swathed in myth and legend. The main source of information on his life is Mahavamsa, the historical poem about the kings of Sri Lanka, which portrays Kavan Tissa as "devoutly believing in the three gems, [and] he provided the brotherhood continually with... needful things".

See also
 Mahavamsa
 List of monarchs of Sri Lanka
 History of Sri Lanka

References

External links 
 Kings & Rulers of Sri Lanka
 Codrington's Short History of Ceylon

Prince of Ruhuna